Robert Weaver may refer to:

Robert Weaver (editor) (1921–2008), Canadian editor and broadcaster
Robert C. Weaver (1907–1997), American politician
Robert Weaver (illustrator) (1924–1994), American illustrator
Robert Weaver (surfer) (born 1965), American surfer
Robert Weaver (MP) (1630–1687), British Member of Parliament
Robert Edward Weaver (1913–1991), American regionalist artist and illustrator
Robert M. Weaver (born 1979), healthcare consultant
Bobby Weaver (born 1958), wrestler
Bob Weaver (weatherman) (1928–2006), American TV weatherman
Bob Weaver (footballer) (1912–?), English footballer